The Legend of Lizzie Borden is a 1975 American historical mystery television film directed by Paul Wendkos and starring Elizabeth Montgomery—in an Emmy-nominated performance—as Lizzie Borden, an American woman who was accused of murdering her father and step-mother in 1892. It co-stars Katherine Helmond, Fritz Weaver, Fionnula Flanagan, and Hayden Rorke. It premiered on ABC on February 10, 1975. The film was nominated for a Golden Globe award for Best Motion Picture Made for Television in 1976.

Plot
Although the film is based on fact, it is a stylized retelling of the events of August 4, 1892, the day the father and step-mother of New England spinster Lizzie Borden were found brutally murdered in their Fall River, Massachusetts home. Public interest in Borden and the murders is exacerbated by her aloof demeanor after the murders, and the public speculates about her involvement in them when she fails to express any emotion during her father and stepmother's funerals.

The subsequent incarceration of the prime suspect (Lizzie herself) as well as the coroner's inquest and the trial are faithfully depicted, using actual testimony. During the trial, various persons testify, including Bridget Sullivan, the Borden's maid from Ireland who was the only other person in the home at the time of the murders.

In what may be seen as a deviation from the film's docudrama narrative, as Lizzie hears her verdict, flashbacks are shown of her actually committing the murders in the nude and bathing after each death, explaining why no blood was ever found on her or her clothes; however, the film's plot with regard to Lizzie's role in the murders remains ambiguous because it does not state that Lizzie was actually reminiscing about the crimes nor does it state that she was simply fantasizing about how she herself would have disposed of her victims. When Lizzie returns home after her acquittal, her sister Emma asks her point-blank if she killed their parents; Lizzie does not answer. The epilogue states that the killings of Andrew and Abby Borden remain unsolved.

Cast

Production

Casting
Elizabeth Montgomery and Lizzie Borden were sixth cousins once removed, both descending from 17th-century Massachusetts resident John Luther. Rhonda McClure, the genealogist who documented the Montgomery-Borden connection, said, "I wonder how Elizabeth would have felt if she knew she was playing her own cousin." One of the gowns which was worn by Montgomery in the film is on display at the bed-and-breakfast which now occupies the Borden house.

Irish actress Fionnula Flanagan was cast in the part of the Borden's maid, Bridget Sullivan, who was originally from Ireland.

Reception

Awards
The film won writer William Bast the 1975 Edgar Award for Best TV Feature/Miniseries. It also won two Emmy Awards, for Costume Design (presented to Guy C. Verhille) and Film Editing (John A. Martinelli), and received nominations in three other Emmy categories: Lead Actress (Montgomery), Art Direction (Jack De Shields), and Sound Editing (Harry Gordon).

The film was also nominated for Best Motion Picture Made for Television in the 1976 Golden Globe Awards.

European version
The European theatrical version is more explicit than the theatrical version which was broadcast on ABC, showing Borden nude in the scenes when she kills her father and stepmother. This version also runs an extra 4 minutes, 104 minutes total versus the United States version of 100 minutes.

Release
A Region 1 DVD release of the film was released on October 7, 2014, and is now available for purchase.

References

External links

ABC Movie of the Week
1975 television films
1975 films
Films about dysfunctional families
Films about capital punishment
American mystery films
1970s crime films
Films directed by Paul Wendkos
Films scored by Billy Goldenberg
Crime films based on actual events
Films set in 1892
Cultural depictions of Lizzie Borden
Films set in Massachusetts
1970s American films